John Brangwyn Page (died 2 February 2005) was a British banking executive who served as the Chief Cashier of the Bank of England from 1970 to 1980. The signature of the Chief Cashier appears on British banknotes. Page was replaced as Chief Cashier by David Somerset.

While at the bank, Page advised on the financing of the Channel Tunnel.

References

Chief Cashiers of the Bank of England
2005 deaths